The 2019 World RX of South Africa was the tenth and final round of the sixth season of the FIA World Rallycross Championship. The event was held at the Killarney Motor Racing Complex in Cape Town, Western Cape.

Supercar 

Source

Heats

Semi-finals 

 Semi-Final 1

 Semi-Final 2

Final

Standings after the event 

Source

 Note: Only the top six positions are included.

References 

|- style="text-align:center"
|width="35%"|Previous race:2019 World RX of Latvia
|width="40%"|FIA World Rallycross Championship2019 season
|width="35%"|Next race:2020 World RX of Sweden
|- style="text-align:center"
|width="35%"|Previous race:2018 World RX of South Africa
|width="40%"|World RX of South Africa
|width="35%"|Next race:none
|- style="text-align:center"

South Africa
World RX
World RX